The canton of Montpon-Ménestérol is an administrative division of the Dordogne department, southwestern France. Its borders were modified at the French canton reorganisation which came into effect in March 2015. Its seat is in Montpon-Ménestérol.

It consists of the following communes:

Échourgnac
Eygurande-et-Gardedeuil
Ménesplet
Montpon-Ménestérol
Moulin-Neuf
Parcoul-Chenaud
Le Pizou
La Roche-Chalais
Saint-Aulaye-Puymangou
Saint-Barthélemy-de-Bellegarde
Saint-Martial-d'Artenset
Saint Privat en Périgord
Saint-Sauveur-Lalande
Saint-Vincent-Jalmoutiers
Servanches

References

Cantons of Dordogne